The Board of Spokespersons is a parliamentary body of the Cortes Generales mainly entrusted with the task of ordering the agenda of the Parliament. As a bicameral legislature, the Cortes Generales are formed by two houses, the Senate and the Congress of Deputies. The Board meets every week.

Each House possesses its own Board of Spokespersons made up by the Speaker of the House and the Spokespersons of every parliamentary group. In addition, the minority groups without an own parliamentary group are represented by the Spokesperson of the Mixed Group.

Members

Chairperson 
The Chairperson of the Board of Spokespersons is the Speaker of the respective House.

Spokesperson 
The Spokesperson of a Parliamentary Group is de facto leader of the Group (although normally they act by orders of the leader of the political party that acts as president of the Parliamentary Group) and a full member of the Board.

Mixed Group 
The Mixed Group is a permanent parliamentary group made up by the members of political parties without enough MPs to form their own Parliamentary Group. From the members of the group a Spokesperson is chosen which represent them.

Other attendants 
To the meetings of the Board also attends a representative of the executive branch (normally the Secretary of State for Relations with the Cortes or the Director-General for Relations with the Cortes). The Clerks of the Cortes Generales also attend to give legal advice.

Senate 

The Board of Spokespersons of the Senate is made up by the Speaker of the Senate and the Spokespersons of the Parliamentary Groups. Normally, the Parliamentary Groups are sub-divided in Territorial Groups, and two representatives for each territorial group is allowed to attend (especially when what is going to be discussed affects a specific region).

The Board of Spokespersons needs to meet to approve (Part III § 44):

 The dates on which the sessions of the House begin and end.
 The agenda of the sessions of the Senate.
 The criteria that contribute to order and facilitate the debates and tasks of the Senate.
 The interpretive or supplementary rules that may be dictated by the Speaker.

Senate' Board

Deputy Spokespersons 

 Socialist Group
 Julián Antonio Rodríguez Esquerdo.
 Francisco Javier Aragón Ariza.
 María Mercedes Berenguer Llorens.
 Ramón Morales Quesada.
 Riansares Serrano Morales.
 María José Villalba Chavarría.
 Popular Group
 Salomé Pradas Ten.
 José Manuel Barreiro Fernández
 Republican Left-EH Bildu Group
 Bernat Picornell Grenzner.
 Gorka Elejabarrieta Díaz.
 Citizens Group
 Francisco José Carillo Guerrero.
 Ruth Goñi Sarries.
 Basque Group
 María Isabel Vaquero Montero.
 Nerea Ahedo Ceza.
 Nationalist Group
 María del Mar del Pino Julios Reyes.
 Podemos Group
 Sara Vilà Galán.
 Mixed Group
 Alberto Prudencio Catalán Higueras.
 Francisco José Alcaraz.

Congress of Deputies 

The Board of Spokespersons of the Congress of Deputies is made up by the Speaker of the Congress of Deputies and the Spokespersons of the Parliamentary Groups. The Spokesperson or the Deputy Spokesperson (if the Spokesperson can't attend) may be assisted by a member of its Parliamentary Group, although with no vote (Part III§ 39). To the meetings of the Board must to attend at least one of the Vice Presidents (or Deputy Speakers) of the Congress, one Secretary of the Congress and the Secretary-General of the Congress of Deputies (an administrative office held by the Senior Clerk).

The Board of Spokespersons is responsible for discussing:

 The agenda of the sessions of the Senate (Part III§ 67).
 All the matters that the Speaker considers need to be discussed.

Congress' Board

Deputy Spokespersons 

 Socialist Group
 Rafael Simancas, First Deputy Spokesperson.
 Ana Belén Fernández Casero, Second Deputy Spokesperson.
 Susana Ros Martínez, Third Deputy Spokesperson.
 Felipe Jesús Sicilia Alférez, Fourth Deputy Spokesperson.
 José Zaragoza Alonso, Fifth Deputy Spokesperson.
 Guillermo Antonio Meijón Couselo, Sixth Deputy Spokesperson.
 Popular Group
 Isabel María Borrego Cortés.
 José Ignacio Echániz.
 Belén Hoyo Juliá.
 Guillermo Mariscal Anaya.
 Jaime Eduardo de Olano.
 Citizens Group
 Fernando de Páramo.
 Joan Mesquida.
 Melisa Rodríguez.
 Antonio Roldán.
 Miguel Ángel Gutiérrez Vivas.
 Podemos Group
 Alberto Garzón.
 Jaume Asens.
 Yolanda Díaz Pérez.
 Ione Belarra.
 Txema Guijarro.
 Vox Group
 Javier Ortega Smith.
 Esquerra Republicana Group
 Carolina Telechea
 Basque Group
 Mikel Legarda.
 Mixed Group
 Joan Baldoví

References

External links 

 Senate Standing Orders in English.
 Congress of Deputies Standing Orders in English.

Cortes Generales
Congress of Deputies (Spain)
Senate of Spain